USS John Basilone (DDG-122) is a Flight IIA -class guided missile destroyer in the United States Navy. The 72nd ship in the class, she is named for United States Marine Corps Gunnery sergeant John Basilone, who received the Medal of Honor, the nation's highest military award for valor, for actions during the Guadalcanal Campaign in the Pacific War. Basilone was the only enlisted Marine to receive both the Medal of Honor and the Navy Cross during World War II.

This is the second US Navy vessel to be named after Basilone, the first being , a  commissioned in 1949 and decommissioned in 1977. The Navy christened USS John Basilone in a ceremony held on 18 June 2022.

References

External links

 

Arleigh Burke-class destroyers